Jürgen Luczak (born 28 November 1943) is a German wrestler. He competed in the men's freestyle 63 kg at the 1968 Summer Olympics.

References

External links
 

1943 births
Living people
German male sport wrestlers
Olympic wrestlers of East Germany
Wrestlers at the 1968 Summer Olympics
People from Murska Sobota